Chalcosyrphus dimidiatus is a species of hoverfly in the family Syrphidae.

Distribution
Nepal, Pakistan.

References

Eristalinae
Insects described in 1923
Diptera of Asia
Taxa named by Enrico Adelelmo Brunetti